The 1928–29 Challenge Cup was the 29th staging of rugby league's oldest knockout competition, the Challenge Cup.

The final was contested by Wigan and Dewsbury at Wembley Stadium in London. This was the first Challenge Cup final to be held at Wembley.

The final was played on Saturday 4 May 1929, where Wigan beat Dewsbury 13–2 in front of a crowd of 41,500.

First round

Second round

Quarterfinals

Semifinals

Final

References

External links
Challenge Cup official website 
Challenge Cup 1928/29 results at Rugby League Project

Challenge Cup
Challenge Cup